Rhopalophora pulverulenta is a species of beetle in the family Cerambycidae. It was described by Félix Édouard Guérin-Méneville in 1844.

References

pulverulenta
Beetles described in 1844
Taxa named by Félix Édouard Guérin-Méneville